The Continuous Revolution Theory (sometimes also translated as the theory of continuing revolution under the dictatorship of the proletariat) is an important element of the thought of Mao Zedong. This is often subsumed under the subject of the Cultural Revolution, but it is worth considering the Continuous Revolution Theory in its own right as an independent topic.

Overview
The Continuous Revolution Theory is rooted in Mao's thoughts regarding the nature of contradiction. He argues that, since contradictions within society between revolutionary and reactionary elements can be expected to continue for a long time, it is necessary to work continuously toward the progressive fulfillment of the revolutionary program. As Mao has written:

"Every difference in men's concepts should be regarded as reflecting an objective contradiction. Objective contradictions are in subjective thinking, and this process constitutes the contradictory movement of concepts, pushes forward the development of thought, and ceaselessly solves problems in man's thinking."

The contention that contradiction is inherent to everything is thus taken to suggest that revolution must be continual if it is not to succumb reactionary forces. The Continuous Revolution Theory is rooted in this fundamental insight regarding the nature of contradiction. It suggests that a revolution cannot really be "over" because contradictions will continue to develop, such that it is necessary to perpetually resolve emergent contradictions in favor of the revolutionary program while resisting the risk of sliding back into reaction. The Continuous Revolution Theory thus rejects any notion of a revolution that is once and for all, since it is impossible to remove contradiction per se from the fabric of nature. Starr makes it clear that contradiction is the central concept of the Continuous Revolution Theory in his discussion of the key themes of the theory:

"These themes are, first, that contradiction or conflict in a society is ubiquitous and permanent and that this condition applies just as surely to a society in the process of socialist transformation as it does to a bourgeois or feudal society."

This leads to the implication that classes within any given society are also a permanent feature of society as such. The only way that these contradictions could be ameliorated is to produce a new society in which human nature itself is transformed in the direction of selflessness and concern for the whole rather than the self. This is why Mao believed, contrary to Marx, that the real struggle was cultural rather than merely economic in nature.

Relationship to the Cultural Revolution
The Continuous Revolution Theory is closely related to but not identical with the Cultural Revolution. More specifically, it was the guiding ideology of the Cultural Revolution, with the latter thus being how the Communist Party of China attempted to implement Continuous Revolution Theory. The Cultural Revolution was itself a result of Mao's perception, in 1966, that the Communist leadership itself had become corrupted:

"Believing that current Communist leaders were taking the party, and China itself, in the 	wrong direction, Mao called on the nation's youth to purge the 'impure' elements of 	Chinese society and revive the revolutionary spirit that had led to victory in the civil war 	20 decades ago and the formation of the People's Republic of China."

The Continuous Revolution Theory required Mao to turn against the Communist leadership itself. Mao turned against the very party for whose creation he was responsible. The theory foresaw that the Communist ruling class can itself turn away from the revolutionary standpoint and become a new ruling class rather than a true dictatorship of the proletariat. This is because new contradictions always emerge, and being revolutionary is determined not merely by one's formal self-identification but rather by the actions that one takes in response to those new contradictions. The Cultural Revolution was inspired by the Continuous Revolution Theory as its guiding ideology. However, according to the theory, even the Cultural Revolution could one day need to be overthrown, insofar as it stopped being truly revolutionary.

Relationship to Marxism
Mao's understanding of contradiction is purely dialectical, which is very close to the original thought of Marx as expressed in classic works such as the Communist Manifesto. However, Continuous Revolution Theory is even more closely related to Hegel than it is to the thought of Marx. According to Hegel, all of human history is a process of Spirit working through its own contradictions and striving to manifest itself at higher and higher levels. Marx believed that Hegel was wrong about the primacy of mind (or spirit) and that the real struggle was rather material/economic in nature. Mao reverses this view back to something closer to Hegel as a result of Mao's belief that cultural transformation is essential for producing the new socialist man. Marx was an inversion of Hegel, but Mao is in some ways almost an inversion of Marx, which ironically returns him to being rather close to Hegel. The Continuous Revolution Theory is essentially idealistic rather than materialistic in nature, and the need for continuous revolution is not based on material conditions per se but rather on the fact that contradiction is metaphysically built into the nature of everything.

Historical evaluation
Mao had the clear insight that revolutions can betray themselves and that the new ruling class that emerges in the aftermath of a revolution may itself need to be challenged through a process of continuous revolution. However, the Cultural Revolution that was driven by the Continuous Revolution Theory was marked by atrocities, and that it would be difficult to unequivocally declare that the Cultural Revolution did, in fact, serve truly revolutionary ends. After the death of Mao and Arrest of the Gang of Four, CCP clearly has no interest in continuous revolution: a new ruling class has in fact consolidated itself. The failure of the Cultural Revolution raises questions about whether the Continuous Revolution Theory is actually practicable.

1975 Chinese Constitution 
The Continuous Revolution Theory is mentioned in the preamble of the 1975 Chinese constitution, which replaced the 1954 constitution and was written in the spirit of the Cultural Revolution.

References 

Cultural Revolution
Maoist terminology